Braystones is a railway station on the Cumbrian Coast Line, which runs between  and . It is owned by Network Rail and managed by Northern Trains.

The station is an unstaffed request stop. It is situated directly on the coast in a remote location. Pearson's 1992 railway guide is moved to comment, "The tiny halts at Braystones and Nethertown are as remote as anything British Rail has to offer...".

History

The station was host to four LMS caravans from 1937 to 1939.

The station buildings are still extant however are in private ownership. As of June 2021 the old station building is called Platform  9 3/4. A bus-stop style shelter is provided on the single platform.

Service

As of the 15 December 2019 timetable (still current at May 2021), five trains call in each direction (on request) from Monday to Friday, with one extra train in each direction on Saturdays.  There is no late evening service, but a limited Sunday service of four trains in each direction (on request) was introduced at the May 2018 timetable change; the first to run over this section since 1976.

References

External links

 
 

Railway stations in Cumbria
DfT Category F2 stations
Former Furness Railway stations
Railway stations in Great Britain opened in 1849
Northern franchise railway stations
Railway request stops in Great Britain
1849 establishments in England